La California is a Caracas Metro station on Line 1. It was opened on 10 November 1989 as part of the extension of Line 1 from Los Dos Caminos to Palo Verde. The station is between Los Cortijos and Petare.

References

Caracas Metro stations
1989 establishments in Venezuela
Railway stations opened in 1989